British India Steam Navigation Company ("BI") was formed in 1856 as the Calcutta and Burmah Steam Navigation Company.

History
The Calcutta and Burmah Steam Navigation Company had been formed out of Mackinnon, Mackenzie & Co, a trading partnership of the Scots William Mackinnon and Robert Mackenzie, to carry mail between Calcutta and Rangoon. It became British India SN Co in 1862. Under the hand of Lord Inchcape, who had become chairman in 1913, the company became part of the P&O group of companies in 1914 through a complex amalgamation, but continued with its own identity and organisation for another nearly 60 years until 1972, when it was entirely absorbed into P&O.

Fleet and routes
As one of the largest shipowners of all time, the company owned more than 500 ships and managed 150 more for other owners. At its height in 1922, BI had more than 160 ships in the fleet, many built on Clydeside, Scotland. The main shipping routes of the line were: Britain to India, Australia, Kenya, Tanganyika. The company ran services from India to Pakistan, Ceylon, Bay of Bengal, Singapore, Malaya, Java, Thailand, Japan, Persian Gulf, East Africa and South Africa. BI had a long history of service to the British and Indian governments through trooping and other military contracts. In the last decade of its operational existence BI carried thousands of school children on educational cruises.

 was sunk in February 1917 by a torpedo from a German submarine off the coast of Ireland with a substantial cargo of silver bullion.

 of 1956 was the final passenger ship built for BI. Serving as a troopship until redundant in 1962, Nevasa was assigned new duties with the BI educational cruise ship flotilla until 1974, when she became uneconomic due a four fold increase in crude oil prices and was scrapped in 1975 having earlier been joined in this trade by the more economic Uganda. The highly popular Uganda was taken up (STUFT) by the British Ministry of Defence in 1982 as a hospital ship during the Falklands war with Argentina. Returning to BI's tradition of government service again in 1983 – this time as a troopship – Uganda was "the last BI" when finally withdrawn in 1985. Dwarka holds the distinction of closing British-India's true "liner" services, when withdrawn from the company's Persian Gulf local trades in 1982, in her 35th year.

Company timeline

Rank badges of ship's complement

Source:

References

 C. Michael Hogan. 2011. SS Gairsoppa recovery. Topic ed. P.Saundry. Ed.-in-chief C.J.Cleveland. Encyclopedia of Earth. National Council for Science and the Environment, Washington DC

External links

 BI Ship Site
 A Short History of British India Steam Navigation
 Clydeside built BI ships
 Miller, William H., The Last Blue Water Liners, Conway Press, London, 1986 - 
 Morton, Michael Quentin, "The British India Line in the Arabian Gulf, 1862-82", Liwa journal, December 2013, Vol. 5, No. 10, pp. 40–63 
 

Defunct shipping companies of the United Kingdom
 
Shipping companies of British India
Shipping companies of Scotland
Economic history of Myanmar
History of Pakistan
British companies established in 1856

1856 establishments in British India
1856 establishments in Scotland
Scotland and the British Empire
P&O (company)